Adetaptera albosticta is a species of beetle in the family Cerambycidae. It was described by Galileo & Martins in 2003.

References

Apomecynini
Beetles described in 2003